Community Building is a historic town hall located at Ticonderoga in Essex County, New York.  It was built in 1927 and is a large two story, five bay neo-Georgian style ashlar granite building with a central bowed portico.  The portico has four Ionic order columns and two engaged pilasters.  It has a slate hipped roof anchored by a central octagonal cupola.

It was listed on the National Register of Historic Places in 1988.

References

Government buildings on the National Register of Historic Places in New York (state)
Colonial Revival architecture in New York (state)
Government buildings completed in 1927
Buildings and structures in Essex County, New York
National Register of Historic Places in Essex County, New York